Don McAllister (born 26 May 1953) is an English former professional footballer who played as a central defender for Bolton Wanderers, Tottenham Hotspur, Charlton Athletic, Tampa Bay Rowdies and Rochdale.

Football career
McAllister joined local club Bolton Wanderers as an apprentice in June 1970. He played on 156 occasions including one as substitute and scoring twice.

He signed for Tottenham Hotspur in February 1975 in a £80,000 transfer deal where he went on to make 209 appearances including five as sub and scoring ten goals in all competitions.

During his career at the club he was a member of the 1977 relegation side and the 1978 team that won promotion and played a part in the FA Cup winning squad of 1980–81.

In the summer of 1977, he went on loan to the Washington Diplomats of the North American Soccer League.

McAllister joined Charlton Athletic in August 1981, where he featured in 55 matches and netted six goals.

In 1984, he played one game for the Tampa Bay Rowdies. He finished his career at Rochdale after a further three appearances.

After football
McAllister emigrated to Sydney, Australia, where he worked as a finance manager for many years. He is now retired and relocated to Queensland in late 2015.

References

External links
 
 Photo & details of Don's career at Bolton & Spurs.
 NASL stats

Living people
1953 births
People from Radcliffe, Greater Manchester
English footballers
English emigrants to Australia
Association football defenders
English Football League players
North American Soccer League (1968–1984) players
Bolton Wanderers F.C. players
Tottenham Hotspur F.C. players
Washington Diplomats (NASL) players
Charlton Athletic F.C. players
Tampa Bay Rowdies (1975–1993) players
Rochdale A.F.C. players
English football managers
Barnet F.C. managers
English expatriate footballers
English expatriate sportspeople in the United States
Expatriate soccer players in the United States